The Madonna's Secret is a 1946 American film noir crime film directed by Wilhelm Thiele and starring Francis Lederer, Gail Patrick, Ann Rutherford and Edward Ashley.

Plot

Drama critic John Earl observes a piece of artwork in a museum, gazing at it reverently. He asks the museum curator how much it costs, and the curator says that it is not for sale. The artist, James Harlan Corbin [Lederer], does not wish to sell the painting. Nonplussed, Earl returns to his office and phones Corbin with his proposal to sell. Again, Corbin refuses. Earl continues his pursuit to find out who the model for the painting was. He learns it is Helen North, a young woman who looks nothing like the woman in the painting. He visits with her to learn his location, but she refuses, telling him that she will be singing at a local nightclub, where Corbin frequents. Earl finds both of them in the museum, and again confronts Corbin. Becoming clearly annoyed, Corbin invites the singer out for a night in his yacht. She agrees, but is later found washed ashore. Although Police Lt. Roberts initially questions Helen's suitor Hunt Mason, Mason implicates Corbin as the last person who saw Helen North. John Earl works with the police department to arrange for Helen's sister Linda to apply for modeling, in order to spy on Corbin. The two return to Corbin's boathouse. While there, Linda calls for Earl and tells his chef that she is in danger and to notify the police. There, she learns that Corbin did not murder her sister. Thereafter, she falls in love with Corbin and agrees to support him against the district attorney's allegations he killed both Helen and another model, Madonna. Although Corbin has visions that he did so, Linda tells him to make sure he is telling the truth before confessing such heinous crimes. Linda returns home with Corbin's mother, who poisons her tea and tries to inject her with a lethal substance before police shoot. Corbin had suddenly recognized who it was that had planted evidence at the boathouse to implicate him. Police arrive just in time to save Linda from death but not Mrs. Corbin, who dies in her son's arms.

Cast
 Francis Lederer as James Harlan Corbin  
 Gail Patrick as Ella Randolph  
 Ann Rutherford as Linda  
 Edward Ashley as John Earl  
 Linda Stirling as Helen North  
 John Litel as Police Lt. Roberts  
 Leona Roberts as Mrs. Corbin  
 Michael St. Angel as Hunt Mason 
 Clifford Brooke as Mr. Hadley  
 Pierre Watkin as District Attorney  
 Will Wright as The Riverman  
 Geraldine Wall as Miss Joyce  
 John Hamilton as Lambert
 Bob Alden as Office Boy 
 Roy Barcroft as Undetermined Role  
 James Carlisle as Doctor  
 Tanis Chandler as Singer  
 Anne Chedister as Madonna 
 Gino Corrado as Boucher - Waiter  
 Jack Daley as Bartender Flynn  
 Edythe Elliott as Landlady  
 Eric Feldary as Knife Thrower  
 Pat Flaherty as Policeman  
 Alex Havier as Ling  
 George Magrill as Policeman  
 Frank O'Connor as Guard  
 Lee Phelps as Detective  
 Rose Plumer as Bit Role  
 Harry Strang as Policeman  
 Russ Whiteman as Interne

References

Bibliography
 Alvarez, Max.  The Crime Films of Anthony Mann. Univ. Press of Mississippi, 2013.

External links

1946 films
1946 crime films
American mystery films
1946 mystery films
1940s English-language films
Films directed by Wilhelm Thiele
Republic Pictures films
Films with screenplays by Wilhelm Thiele
American black-and-white films
Film noir
1940s American films